Gilbert Gerard may refer to:

Sir Gilbert Gerard (judge) (died 1593), English lawyer, politician, and landowner
Gilbert Gerard (MP for City of Chester) (died 1609), English politician
Gilbert Gerard, 2nd Baron Gerard (died 1622), Baron of Gerards Bromley, England
Sir Gilbert Gerard (Governor of Worcester) (died 1646), Royalist colonel during the English Civil War
Sir Gilbert Gerard, 1st Baronet of Harrow on the Hill (1587–1670), English politician
Gilbert Gerard of Crewood (1604–1673), Parliamentary colonel during the First English Civil War
Sir Gilbert Gerard (died 1683) English lawyer and politician
Sir Gilbert Gerard, 1st Baronet of Fiskerton (died 1687), English politician and Royalist captain
Gilbert Gerard (theological writer) (1760–1815), Moderator of the General Assembly of the Church of Scotland, 1803
Gil Gerard (Gilbert C. Gerard, born 1943), American actor